Oman sent a delegation to compete at the 2008 Summer Paralympics in Beijing, People's Republic of China. According to official records, the only athlete was powerlifter Badar Al Harthy.

Powerlifting

Men

See also
Oman at the Paralympics
Oman at the 2008 Summer Olympics

References

External links
International Paralympic Committee

Nations at the 2008 Summer Paralympics
2008
Summer Paralympics